Haldia Institute of Maritime Studies and Research, situated in Haldia, West Bengal, India, offers diploma and bachelor's degree courses in Nautical Science. This college is affiliated to Maulana Abul Kalam Azad University of Technology.

References

External links 

Universities and colleges in Purba Medinipur district
Colleges affiliated to West Bengal University of Technology
Haldia
2008 establishments in West Bengal
Educational institutions established in 2008